Niccolai is an Italian surname. Notable people with the surname include:

Armand Niccolai (1911–1988), American football player
Comunardo Niccolai (born 1946), Italian footballer
Giulia Niccolai (1934–2021), Italian photographer, poet, novelist and translator

See also
Nicolai (disambiguation), German variant
Nicolay (disambiguation), French variant
Nikolai (disambiguation) or Nikolay, Slavic forms

Italian-language surnames
Patronymic surnames
Surnames from given names